The First Parish Church is an Open and Affirming congregation of the United Church of Christ. The church meetinghouse sits at 207 Maine Street in Brunswick, Maine. Built in 1845 to a design by Richard Upjohn, it is a unique example of Gothic Revival architecture done in wood, as the church was built with vertical board-and-batten paneling.  It was listed on the National Register of Historic Places in 1969.  The congregation dates to 1717. The Senior Pastor is Rev. John Allen.

Description and history
The First Parish Church occupies a prominent location on a rise between downtown Brunswick and the Bowdoin College campus, which lies directly to its south.  It is a single-story wood frame structure, whose Gothic Revival features include a buttressed tower, lancet-arched openings for doors and windows, and vertical board-and-batten siding.  It originally had a spire, which was blown off in a storm in 1866 and not replaced.

The church congregation was founded in 1717, for which this is the fourth church.  It was built, on the site of the third church, in 1846 by the labor of the congregation, to a design by the noted American architect Richard Upjohn.  Funding was provided in part by Bowdoin College, and it has been used by the college for commencement exercises and other activities.  The attached vestry was built in 1883.

On May 2, 1851, American author Harriet Beecher Stowe had a vision while sitting in pew 23 of the church wherein she saw an enslaved man wounded from a beating he endured from his enslaver. The incident inspired her book Uncle Tom's Cabin. After years in disrepair, the church underwent extensive restoration, which was completed in 2004; the restoration earned the church a Maine Preservation Honor Award in 2006.

See also

National Register of Historic Places listings in Cumberland County, Maine

References

External links
First Parish Church web site

Churches in Cumberland County, Maine
Churches on the National Register of Historic Places in Maine
Gothic Revival church buildings in Maine
Churches completed in 1845
19th-century United Church of Christ church buildings
Buildings and structures in Brunswick, Maine
National Register of Historic Places in Cumberland County, Maine
Historic district contributing properties in Maine